Fort Atkinson is the name of several locations in the United States:

Fort Atkinson, Iowa, a town named after General Atkinson
Fort Atkinson State Preserve, 1840s U.S. Army post in Fort Atkinson, Iowa
Fort Atkinson (Kansas), an 1850s U.S. Army post
Fort Atkinson (Nebraska), 1820s U.S. Army post
Fort Atkinson, Wisconsin, a city
Fort Koshkonong, a Black Hawk War fort in Wisconsin sometimes called Fort Atkinson